Nick Adrian Becker (born July 30, 1968) is an American volleyball player who competed in the 1992 Summer Olympics.

He was born in Fullerton, California.

In 1992 he was part of the American team which won the bronze medal in the Olympic tournament. He played three matches.

References

 

1968 births
Living people
American men's volleyball players
Volleyball players at the 1992 Summer Olympics
Olympic bronze medalists for the United States in volleyball
Medalists at the 1992 Summer Olympics
Pepperdine Waves men's volleyball players